Elizabeth Anna Sophia Dawes (1864–1954) was a 19th-century British classical scholar and the first woman to receive a DLitt degree from the University of London.

Early life 
Elizabeth was born in 1864 in Kingston, Surrey. In the 1881 census, aged 16, she is already listed as 'scholar'. At this time, the family, consisting of father the Revd John Samuel, mother Anna Sophia Elizabeth (or called Elizabeth Anna Sophia as well, according to the Oxford Dictionary of National Biography) and eight children, live at Newton House on Maple Road in Surbiton.

Her older sister  was also a scholar, and the first woman to receive a Masters in Arts.
Mary Clara Dawes passed the matriculation examination in January 1879 and placed fourth in the list of masters of arts for the University of London in July 1884.

Education 
Elizabeth Dawes was a Scholar at Girton College, Cambridge. She got a good mark in the Classical Tripos but, as was the rule at that time, could not graduate from the University of Cambridge with a degree. Her good results are notable because girls generally received an inferior education to their male counterparts, which generally translated into lower marks in the Tripos.

She subsequently acquired a BA from the University of London, as well as being the first women to receive a DLitt from the University of London, in 1895. The title of her thesis was 'The Pronunciation of Greek with Suggestions for a Reform in Teaching that Language', indicating an early interest in educational reform which would persist into her career as a headmistress of a girls' school.

Career 
Contrary to many women of the Victorian era, Dawes had a career. In addition to a professorship held at Bryn Mawr College in the US during the academic year 1886-7, when she was only 22, she was headmistress of a school in Surrey together with her sister Mary. In 1928, she translated Anna Comnena's Alexiad from Greek into English. The work is still in print almost 90 years later.

Select bibliography 

 The pronunciation of Greek with suggestions for a reform in teaching that language (1889)
 Classical Latin vocabularies for schools and colleges (1890)
 Attic Greek vocabularies for schools and colleges (1890)
 The pronunciation of the Greek aspirates (1894)

References 

1864 births
1954 deaths
Alumni of Girton College, Cambridge
Alumni of the University of London
Classical scholars of Bryn Mawr College
English classical scholars
Women classical scholars
People from Kingston upon Thames